My Name may refer to:

 My Name (band), from South Korea
 My Name (BoA album)
 My Name (Lena Philipsson album)
 My Name (Mélanie Pain album)
 "My Name" (McLean song)
 "My Name", a song from the musical Oliver!
 "My Name", a song by Xzibit from Man vs. Machine
 "My Name", a song by Anoop Desai from All Is Fair
 My Name (TV series), a 2021 South Korean TV series